Wide Open Faces is a 1938 American comedy film directed by Kurt Neumann and starring Joe E. Brown, Jane Wyman and Alison Skipworth. The screenplay concerns a man who tries to prevent mobsters getting their hands on loot that they have stashed in an inn.

Cast
 Joe E. Brown as Wilbur Meeks  
 Jane Wyman as Betty Martin  
 Alison Skipworth as Auntie Martha  
 Lyda Roberti as Kitty Fredericks  
 Alan Baxter as Tony  
 Lucien Littlefield as P. T. 'Doc' Williams  
 Sidney Toler as Sheriff  
 Berton Churchill as L.D. Crawford  
 Barbara Pepper as Belle  
 Joe Downing as Stretch 
 Stanley Fields as Duke Temple  
 Garry Owen as Pineapple  
 Dick Rich as Fingers  
 Walter Wills as Hardcastle

References

Bibliography
 Quinlan, David. The Film Lover's Companion: An A to Z Guide to 2,000 Stars and the Movies They Made. Carol Publishing Group, 1997.

External links
 

1938 films
1938 comedy films
American comedy films
Films directed by Kurt Neumann
Columbia Pictures films
American black-and-white films
1930s English-language films
1930s American films